Aïn El Melh District is a district of M'Sila Province, Algeria.

Municipalities
The district is further divided into 5 municipalities:

Aïn El Melh
Bir Foda
Aïn Fares
Sidi M'Hamed
Aïn Errich

District of M'Sila Province